Stopford William Wentworth Brooke (1859 –  23 April 1938) was a British politician. He was a Liberal Member of Parliament (MP) from 1906 to 1910.

Biography
Brooke was born in Kensington, London, the son of Stopford Brooke, an Irish clergymen, chaplain to Queen Victoria and writer, and his wife Emma (née Wentworth-Beaumont). He was educated at Winchester College and University College, Oxford, graduating in 1881. He was a Unitarian minister in England between 1883 and 1886 and then went to America where he was minister at the First Church (Unitarian) in Boston, Massachusetts. He married Helen Ellis from Boston in 1903. They had one son and a daughter. His wife died in 1928.

He was elected to the Commons in the 1906 general election, succeeding the Conservative MP Walter Guthrie in the Bow and Bromley constituency.  He left Parliament in the January 1910 general election and was succeeded by the Conservative Alfred du Cros. He tried to re-enter Parliament at the December 1910 general election as a Liberal candidate at Bassetlaw in Nottinghamshire and was defeated by the sitting Unionist MP William Ellis Hume-Williams by a narrow 215 vote margin.

His son, Somerset Stopford Brooke, also stood for Parliament as Liberal candidate in Guildford at the 1929 general election and as Liberal National in Shoreditch in 1935 .

References
Specific

General

External links 
 

Liberal Party (UK) MPs for English constituencies
UK MPs 1906–1910
English Unitarians
19th-century Unitarian clergy
Politics of the London Borough of Tower Hamlets
Politics of Nottinghamshire
1859 births
1938 deaths